Besta (Беста) is a Soviet Unix-based graphics workstation. Starting in 1988, more than 1,000 were produced.

There were several versions of the computer. Besta-88 has a Motorola 68020 CPU and VME bus.

The Bestix operating system is a legally ported version of AT&T UNIX System V Release 3.2.

External links
 «Беста-88», Natalia Dubova (in russian)
 Linux in Russia (in russian) - contains a citation of M. Moshkov on Besta

68k-based computers
Soviet computer systems